Mohnia abyssorum is a species of sea snail, a marine gastropod mollusk in the family Buccinidae, the true whelks.

Description
The length of the shell attains 34.5 mm.

Distribution
This marine species occurs off the Azores.

References

 Mayhew, R.; Cole, F. (1994). A taxonomic discussion and update of shell-bearing marine molluscs recorded from NW Atlantic North of Cape Cod (excluding Greenland), and Canadian Arctic Archipeligo.
 Sysoev A.V. (2014). Deep-sea fauna of European seas: An annotated species check-list of benthic invertebrates living deeper than 2000 m in the seas bordering Europe. Gastropoda. Invertebrate Zoology. Vol.11. No.1: 134–155

External links
 Fischer, P. (1884 ["1883"). Diagnoses d'espèces nouvelles de mollusques recueillis dans le cours de l'expédition scientifique du "Talisman. Journal de Conchyliologie. 31: 391-394]
 Verrill A. E. (1884). Second catalogue of mollusca recently added to the fauna of the New England Coast and the adjacent parts of the Atlantic, consisting mostly of deep sea species, with notes on others previously recorded. Transactions of the Connecticut Academy of Arts and Sciences, 6(1): 139-294, pl. 28-32
  Gofas, S.; Le Renard, J.; Bouchet, P. (2001). Mollusca. in: Costello, M.J. et al. (eds), European Register of Marine Species: a check-list of the marine species in Europe and a bibliography of guides to their identification. Patrimoines Naturels. 50: 180-213

Buccinidae
Gastropods described in 1883